STUC may refer to:

 Scottish Trades Union Congress
 Samoa Trade Union Congress
 Star Trek VI: The Undiscovered Country (ST:UC) a science-fiction film

See also
 Stuck (disambiguation)
 STUK (disambiguation)